Martin Wirsing (born 24 December 1948 in Bayreuth) is a German computer scientist, and Professor at the Ludwig-Maximilians-Universität München, Germany.

Biography 
Wirsing studied Mathematics at Ludwig-Maximilians-Universität München (LMU) and at Université Paris 7, obtaining the Diplom in Mathematics from LMU and the Mâitrise-ès-Sciences Mathématiques at the Université Paris 7. Supervised by Kurt Schütte, he received his PhD from LMU in 1976, with a thesis on a topic in mathematical logic (Das Entscheidungsproblem der Prädikatenlogik mit Identität und  Funktionszeichen). In 1975-1983 he was a research assistant at the chair of F.L. Bauer at Technical University of Munich where in 1984 he completed his Habilitation in Informatics; in 1985 Wirsing became full professor and Chair of Informatics at the University of Passau and in 1992 he returned to LMU as the Chair of Programming and Software Engineering. Several years he served as Dean, Head of Department and Vice President of the Senat of LMU. Since 2010 he is Vice President for Teaching and Studies of LMU. In July 2016, he was awarded a Degree of Doctor of Science (Honoris Causa) by Royal Holloway, University of London.

His research interests comprise software engineering and its formal foundations, autonomous self-aware systems, and digitisation of universities. In 2006-2015  he was coordinating the European IP projects SENSORIA (2006-2010)  on software engineering for service-oriented systems and ASCENS (2010-2015) on engineering collective autonomic systems. In 2007-2010 Martin Wirsing was the chairman of the Scientific Board of INRIA and in 2014-2017 a member of the scientific committee of Institut Mines-Télécom. Currently, he is a member of the board of trustees of Max Planck Institute of Psychiatry and of the scientific committees of the University of Bordeaux and IMDEA Software Institute. He is a member of the editorial board of several scientific journals and book series including Theoretical Computer Science (journal), International Journal of Software and Informatics, and Electronic Proceedings in Theoretical Computer Science.

Selected papers and books 

 Martin Wirsing: Algebraic Specification. In: J. van Leeuwen (ed.): Handbook of Theoretical Computer Science, Amsterdam, North-Holland, 1990, pp. 675–788
 
 Pietro Cenciarelli, Alexander Knapp, Bernhard Reus, and Martin Wirsing. An Event-Based Structural Operational Semantics of Multi-Threaded Java. In: Jim Alves-Foss (ed.): Formal Syntax and Semantics of Java, Lect. Notes Comp. Sci. 1523, Berlin: Springer, 1999, pp. 157–200
 Iman Poernomo, John Crossley, Martin Wirsing: Adapting Proofs-as-Programs: The Curry—Howard Protocol. Springer Monographs in Computer Science, 2005, 420 pages
 Martin Wirsing, Jean-Pierre Banatre, Matthias Hölzl, Axel Rauschmayer (Eds.): Software-Intensive Systems and New Computing Paradigms. Lecture Notes in Computer Science 5380, Springer-Verlag, 2008, 265 pages
 Martin Wirsing, Matthias Hölzl (Eds.): Rigorous Software Engineering for Service-Oriented Systems - Results of the SENSORIA Project on Software Engineering for Service-Oriented Computing. Lecture Notes in Computer Science 6582, Springer 2011, 737 pages
 Jonas Eckhardt, Tobias Mühlbauer, Musab AlTurki, José Meseguer, Martin Wirsing: Stable Availability under Denial of Service Attacks through Formal Patterns. In: Juan de Lara, Andrea Zisman (Eds.): Fundamental Approaches to Software Engineering - 15th International Conference, FASE 2012. Lecture Notes in Computer Science 7212, Springer 2012, pp. 78–93
 Martin Wirsing, Matthias Hölzl, Nora Koch and Philip Mayer (eds.). Software Engineering for Collective Autonomic Systems: Results of the ASCENS Project, Vol. 8998 LNCS, Springer, 2015, 533 pages
 Lenz Belzner, Rolf Hennicker, Martin Wirsing: OnPlan: A Framework for Simulation-Based Online Planning. Christiano Braga, Peter Csaba Ölveczky: Formal Aspects of Component Software - 12th International Conference, FACS 2015, Niterói, Brazil, October 14–16, 2015, Revised Selected Papers. Lecture Notes in Computer Science 9539, Springer 2016, pp. 1–30

External links
 Home page
 Home page at LMU
 Rocco De Nicola, Rolf Hennicker (eds.):Software, Services, and Systems - Essays Dedicated to Martin Wirsing on the Occasion of His Retirement from the Chair of Programming and Software Engineering. Lecture Notes in Computer Science 8950, Springer 2015,  
 Publications of Martin Wirsing indexed by the DBLP Bibliography Server at the University of Trier

References

German computer scientists
1948 births
Academic staff of the University of Passau
Academic staff of the Ludwig Maximilian University of Munich
Ludwig Maximilian University of Munich alumni
Living people
Recipients of the Cross of the Order of Merit of the Federal Republic of Germany